The 2019 E3 BinckBank Classic is a road cycling one-day race, scheduled to be held on 29 March 2019 in Belgium. It is the 62nd edition of E3 Harelbeke and the eleventh event of the 2019 UCI World Tour.

The event was rebranded "E3 BinckBank Classic" due to a sponsorship agreement with Dutch online discount broker BinckBank. However, the race perpetuates its ties with Harelbeke, which continues to host the start and finish. Dutch rider Niki Terpstra won the previous edition in 2018.

Results

References

External links

2019 UCI World Tour
2019 in Belgian sport
2019
March 2019 sports events in Belgium